Fakenham is a market town and civil parish in Norfolk, England. The town is the junction of several local roads, including the A148 from King's Lynn to Cromer, the A1067 to Norwich and the A1065 to Swaffham.

For the purposes of local government, the parish falls within the district of North Norfolk.

Fakenham has been a market town since 1250, particularly known for its corn, barley and wheat trading, and in the 19th century it became noted for its printing. Fakenham Racecourse is a thoroughbred horse racing venue to the south of Fakenham.

The town has a long name of Fakenham Lancaster which derives from the ownership of the manor in 1377 being transferred to John of Gaunt, the Duke of Lancaster. The name continues to be used today, including on recently placed history trail plaques around the town, and also the two wards that cover the town, for the purpose of electing councillors to North Norfolk District Council, are called Lancaster North and Lancaster South.

History
The name Fakenham is Saxon and has been interpreted as meaning "homestead of Facca", or "Fair Place"/"Place on a Fair River". Numerous arrowheads and flint tools found the parish indicate occupation during Neolithic times. Two copper alloy socketed axeheads have been unearthed in Fakenham dated to the Bronze Age. In 2015, a lead plaque was found near Fakenham dating to the Early Medieval period, and has been interpreted as having used to overcome an illness-causing dwarf based on its runic inscription.

Before 1066 the manor of Fakenham was held by King Harold, before being taken by King William the Conqueror. The manor was relatively large, containing surrounding villages such as Pudding Norton and Thorpland. A number of Early to Late Saxon brooches, buckles, pottery have been unearthed in the area. A Middle Saxon coin found in the parish is of the East Anglian king Beonna. A watermill was mentioned in Fakenham in the Domesday Book of 1086, but it was later demolished.

In November 1297, Guy Ferre was recorded as the owner of Fakenham Manor, which King Edward I had given to him for life. During the 13th century, the hamlet of Thorpland had  90 parishioners but by the 16th century it had largely been depopulated, and today all that remains is the hall.

Fires broke out in the town in 1660, 1718 and 1738, which destroyed or partly destroyed a number of buildings. The 4 August 1738 fire destroyed 26 buildings in Fakenham.

Geography
Fakenham is situated in North Norfolk district, between Pudding Norton and Barsham, on the north bank of the River Wensum. To the southeast of Fakenham is Pensthorpe Natural Park, which contains over 700 acres of woodland and lakes and four gardens.

Economy
Fakenham has been a market town since 1250. Agricultural products and cattle have long been sold at the town's Corn Hall and flea market. John Chambers wrote in his A General History of the County of Norfolk (1829): "Fakenham is a small town, with a good corn market, attended by buyers from Wells, and other contiguous ports. The general market here is on Thursdays, when a large quantity of barley and wheat are sold by samples".

During the 19th century, Fakenham became a major centre for printing, which continued into the 20th century. Fakenham Prepress Solutions is a contemporary printing and illustratrating company based in Fakenham. The Kinnerton Confectionery Company was established in the town in 1978.

Landmarks

Fakenham contains the 14th-century Saint Peter and Saint Paul Parish Church, which replaced an earlier Saxon Church. The  tower was built in the 15th century. Baron's Hall was originally built in 1593 but was demolished in 1812 and a new hall opened in 1825. The Corn Hall opened in 1855, replacing an earlier sessions building which had a library and magistrates' court. The Corn Hall served as the local headquarters for the Home Guard during World War II.

The Star Inn on Oak Street was built in the 17th century. Grove House, The Red Lion, The Wooden Horse and Barclays Bank retain some 17th-century features.  The town also contains the Fakenham Museum of Gas and Local History, which displays equipment used for making gas from coal.

Sport
Fakenham Cricket Club is one of the oldest in Norfolk; it started in 1815 with a combined team, including Hempton and Walsingham, and formed in its own right in 1883. The 1st team of the club won the Norfolk Alliance Premier Division league title in 2001, 2011, 2015 and 2018; also the Carter Cup in 2010. Queens Road Recreation Ground is a recreational ground in the centre of Fakenham. 

Fakenham Golf Club, on the southern outskirts of the town on the southern side of the Wensum, was originally established in February 1889. The present 6,245 yard course was designed in 1974. 

Fakenham Racecourse is a thoroughbred horse racing venue to the south of the town. Charles III is patron. It is the venue for the West Norfolk Hunt's Point to Point steeplechase.

Transport

Fakenham is not currently served by the railway network, however it previously had two railway stations. , opened as Fakenham on 20 March 1849, was the terminus of the Wymondham to Wells Branch railway. It was proposed for closure in the 1963 Beeching Report.  opened in 1880 and closed in 1959. It was built as part of the Midland and Great Northern Joint Railway main line that meandered across Norfolk from King's Lynn to Sheringham, Cromer, Norwich and Great Yarmouth. There was no connection between the two railway lines: the line south of Fakenham West crossed the line from Fakenham East south of the former station, on a girder bridge that still exists immediately north of a three-span bridge over the River Wensum.

Following Fakenham East's closure on 5 October 1964 to passengers, the line remained opened for goods. A special passenger service named the Fakenham Flyer ran on 21 April 1979, but this proved to be the only such instance, as the line closed permanently the following year.

Fakenham is served by several bus routes operated by different companies, including local services, and longer distance routes to King's Lynn, Norwich, Holt and Sheringham.

The town is at the junction of several local roads, including the A148 from King's Lynn to Cromer, the A1067 to Norwich and the A1065 to Swaffham. A single-carriageway bypass was constructed in the mid-1980s to carry the A148 to the north of the town.

Notable people

Notable people from Fakenham include:
Thomas Miller, bookseller and antiquarian.
Sir Robert Seppings, a shipwright who was knighted on the Royal Yacht in 1819.
Sir George Edwards, farm workers' leader, and later local MP.
Peter Parfitt, an England and Middlesex cricketer in the early 1960s, attended Fakenham Grammar School.
Horatio Nelson
Simon Dring, journalist and television producer.

Other notable people from the town include footballing brothers Ryan Jarvis and Rossi Jarvis, formerly of Norwich City and Adam Tann, whose League career ended at Chelmsford City and is the cousin of the Jarvis brothers. Another former Norwich City footballer, Matt Gill, grew up in the town and attended the local junior school and high school.

References

External links

Information from Genuki Norfolk on Fakenham.
Fakenham Town Council

 
Towns in Norfolk
Market towns in Norfolk
Civil parishes in Norfolk
North Norfolk